Urwah Ibn Abi Al-Ja"d Al-Bariq, was a companion of Muhammad. He was a governor of Kufa and was involved in the early Muslim conquests of Persia.

Lineage
Urwah Ibn Abi Al-Ja"d Al-Bariqi From Bariq Ibn Uday Ibn Haritha Ibn Amr Mazikiee Ibn Aamr bin Haritha Algtarif bin Imru al-Qais Thailb bin Mazen Ibn Al-Azd Ibn Al-Ghoth Ibn Nabit Ibn Ismail or Malik bin Zaid Ibn Kahlan Ibn Saba'a ( Sheba ) Ibn Yashjub (Yaman) Ibn Yarub Ibn Qahtan Ibn (Abir)) .

Ahadith transmitted by him
Narrated: Urwa said that the Messenger of Allah said "Good will remain (as a permanent quality) in the forelocks of horses (meant for Jihad) till the Day of Resurrection, for they bring about a reward (in the Hereafter) or booty (in this world).

Muhammad invoked a blessing on him 
Muhammad gave him a dinar to buy a sacrificial animal or a sheep. He bought two sheep, sold one of them for a dinar, and brought him a sheep and dinar. So he invoked a blessing on him in his business dealing, and he was such that if had he bought dust he would have made a profit from it.

Sunni view
He is one of the narrators of hadith, and like all of the Sahaba, is considered trustworthy.

Shi'a view
Urwah is considered trustworthy.

Generals of the medieval Islamic world
Companions of the Prophet
Banu Bariq
Arab generals
681 deaths
Year of birth unknown
Rashidun governors of Kufa